Street Magic is the second book in the quartet The Circle Opens by fantasy author Tamora Pierce.
It describes the further adventures of child-mage Briar Moss in his travels with his teacher, the Dedicate Initiate Rosethorn.

Plot introduction
Street Magic is set in Chammur, a city in the country of Sotat, which has been left to itself for many decades. Many of the city's structures are made of stone.

Plot summary

While Briar and his teacher Rosethorn are helping the locals in Chammur, Briar realizes that all is not as it should be in Chammur's streets. As a former 'street rat' himself, he tends to have an interest in the affairs of local gangs. He discovers a gang known as the Vipers roaming through territory not their own. After further investigation, Briar discovers that the Vipers are the pet gang of a local Noblewoman.

While Briar investigates the Vipers, he discovers Evvy, a local girl with stone magic. At first, she runs away from him, but she gradually learns to trust him. When Evvy singularly refuses to study with local stone mage Jebilu Stoneslicer, Briar takes her training in hand himself. The Vipers attempt to kidnap her many times, so Lady Zenadia doa Atteneh can use Evvy's powers as a stone mage to further increase her riches. When they finally kidnap her, Briar comes to her rescue.

Characters 
Briar Moss  – a fourteen-year-old plant mage who is traveling with his teacher, Rosethorn. Briar is part of a group of young mages who have become famous across the land. The other three members are Sandry, Tris, and Daja.

Rosethorn  – Briar's teacher in plant magic. Rosethorn is a dedicate initiate of Winding Circle Temple.

Evvy – a street child who was sold as a slave by her parents, only to escape. She has powerful stone magic. She is unusual in the fact that she belongs to no gang. Almost all children in Chammur belong in gangs so they can be protected.

Lady Zenadia doa Atteneh – a rich widow who is connected with the street gang known as the Vipers. She orders her pet gang to kidnap Evvy multiple times, resulting in failure all but once. She may be a perfectionist, as she doesn't accept failure, killing (ordering her eunuch to strangle them) those who fail her. At the end of the book, she commits suicide.

See also

Battle Magic
Melting Stones
The Will of the Empress

References

American fantasy novels
Emelanese books
2001 American novels
2001 fantasy novels